Many recipients of orders, decorations, and medals of the United Kingdom have had them revoked, often following conviction for crimes or breaches of military discipline, or when their conduct has been widely considered discreditable. In other cases, prominent nationals of countries with which the UK has later found itself at war or in dispute have had their honours revoked.

Victoria Cross

All 8 revocations were restored to the Victoria Cross register by King George V in the 1920s.

1861: Valentine Bambrick (awarded 1858), following his conviction for assault and theft of a comrade's medals.
1861: Edward St John Daniel (awarded 1857), following his conviction for desertion and evading court-martial.
1862: James McGuire (awarded 1858), following his conviction for stealing a cow.
1872: Michael Murphy (awarded 1859), following his conviction for theft.
1881: Thomas Lane (awarded 1861), following his conviction for desertion and theft.
1884: Frederick Corbett (awarded 1883), following his conviction for embezzlement and theft from an officer.
1895: James Collis (awarded 1881), following his conviction for bigamy.
1908: George Ravenhill (awarded 1901), following his conviction for theft.

Military Cross

2014: Major Robert Armstrong (awarded 2009) over concerns that the "...medal citation may not have been accurate in its details. Armstrong was dismissed from the Army two years ago for keeping top secret documents at his home. Military police also found hundreds of rounds of ammunition there."
2016: Captain William Boreham (awarded 2012) after it was found that senior officers exaggerated his bravery.

Privy Council of the United Kingdom

2 March 1687: Sir Thomas Chicheley, following his fall from favour.
January 1721: John Aislabie, following his conviction for corruption.
13 December 1921: Sir Edgar Speyer, 1st Baronet, for pro-German activities during the First World War.
8 June 2011: Elliot Morley, after he was convicted and jailed in connection with the United Kingdom parliamentary expenses scandal.
10 October 2013: Denis MacShane, after he was convicted (and later jailed) in connection with the United Kingdom parliamentary expenses scandal.

Order of the Garter

KG

 1915: Wilhelm II, German Emperor (appointed 1877), following the start of World War I.
 1915: Franz Joseph I of Austria (appointed 1867), following the start of World War I; also stripped of his GCVO.
 1915: Prince Heinrich of Prussia (appointed 1889), following the start of World War I.
 1915: Ernest Louis, Grand Duke of Hesse (appointed 1892), following the start of World War I.
 1915: Wilhelm, German Crown Prince (appointed 1901), following the start of World War I.
 1915: Ernest Augustus, Crown Prince of Hanover (appointed 1878), following the start of World War I; also stripped of his British titles of Duke of Cumberland and Teviotdale, Earl of Armagh and Prince of the United Kingdom.
 1915: Charles Edward, Duke of Saxe-Coburg-Gotha (appointed 1902), following the start of World War I; also stripped of his British titles of Duke of Albany, Earl of Clarence, Baron Arklow and Prince of the United Kingdom.
 1915: Wilhelm II of Württemberg (appointed 1904), following the start of World War I; also stripped of his GCB and Royal Victorian Chain.
 1941: Victor Emmanuel III of Italy (appointed 1891), expelled when Italy declared war on the United Kingdom during World War II.
 1941: Hirohito (appointed 1929), revoked during World War II, restored in 1971.

Order of the Bath

KB
1814: Thomas Cochrane, Lord Cochrane (appointed 1809; later appointed a GCB in 1847 after the 1815 reforms) due to fraud conviction in the Great Stock Exchange Fraud of 1814

GCB
1816: Eyre Coote (appointed 1815) "due to conduct unworthy of an officer and a gentleman"
1940: Benito Mussolini (1883–1945) (appointed 1923), stripped of his honorary GCB after Italy's declaration of war against the Allies.
1989: Nicolae Ceauşescu (stripped of his honorary GCB by Queen Elizabeth II on the day before Ceauşescu's execution)
2008: Robert Gabriel Mugabe (appointed 1994, but on 25 June 2008, Queen Elizabeth II cancelled and annulled the honorary GCB after advice from the Foreign Secretary of the United Kingdom)

CB

1918: Colonel Percy Holland (appointed 1913)
1975: William George Pottinger (appointed 1972), following his conviction for corruptly receiving gifts from architect John Poulson; Pottinger's CVO was also revoked.
2013: Vicky Pryce (appointed 2009), following her conviction for conspiracy to pervert the course of justice.

Order of St Michael and St George

GCMG
1931: Owen Philipps, 1st Baron Kylsant, for fraud for issuing a misleading stock prospectus; also stripped of his KStJ.

CMG

1880: James Craig Loggie following his conviction for "embezzlement and misappropriation of money"
1916: Roger Casement, following his conviction for high treason and prior to his execution; also stripped of his Kt.

Royal Victorian Order

GCVO

 1915: Franz Joseph I of Austria, following the start of WW1; also stripped of his KG.
 1915: Prince Leopold of Bavaria, following the start of WW1.

KCVO

1979: Anthony Blunt (1956), following his exposure as a member of the Cambridge Five, a group of spies working for the Soviet Union from some time in the 1930s to at least the early 1950s.

CVO

1948: Major FitzRoy Hubert Fyers (appointed 1939).
1975: William George Pottinger (appointed 1953), following his conviction for corruption; Pottinger's CB was also revoked.
2018: Hubert Chesshyre (appointed 2003 and LVO in 1988), following a trial of the facts during which he was found to have committed child sexual abuse offences.

MVO

1911: The Reverend Frederic Percival Farrar (appointed 1911).
2004: Cyril Littlewood (appointed 2001), following his conviction for sexual abuse (MBE also revoked).
2007: Michael Joseph Delaney (appointed 2005) 
2017: Ronald Clifford Harper (appointed 2004) following his conviction for conspiracy to make corrupt payments.

Order of the Indian Empire

CIE

Lieutenant-Colonel Eknath Hathi (appointed 1917)

Knight Bachelor

1916: Roger Casement, following his conviction for high treason and prior to his execution; also stripped of his CMG.
1918: Joseph Jonas, after being convicted of a misdemeanour as a result of the anti-German sentiments in Britain at the time because of the First World War. In addition, his British citizenship was revoked, but he was not deported.
1980: Joseph Kagan, Baron Kagan, following his conviction for theft.
1991: Jack Lyons (appointed 1967) following his conviction for fraud. and was fined £3 million plus £1 million prosecution costs.
1993: Terry Lewis, after being convicted of 16 counts of perjury, corruption, and forgery. 
2012: Fred Goodwin, after widespread criticism of his conduct as Chief Executive of the Royal Bank of Scotland Group.
2013: James Crosby, after widespread criticism of his conduct as Chief Executive of Halifax Bank.
2014: Alan Seymour Davies, following his conviction for false accounting.
2015: George Castledine (appointed 2007), after he was struck off the nursing register for sexual misconduct.
2016: Allan Kemakeza (appointed 2001), after being convicted of demanding money with menace, intimidation and larceny.
2021: Ron Brierley (appointed 1988), after being charges of possessing child abuse material.

Order of the British Empire

KBE

1980: Albert Royle Henry (appointed 1974), following his conviction for electoral fraud.

DBE

2011: Jean Else (appointed 2001), following a General Teaching Council misconduct hearing banning her from running a school.

CBE

1921: Lieutenant-Colonel Basil John Blenkinsop Coulson (appointed 1920)
1923: Richard Williamson (appointed 1918)
1940: Vidkun Quisling (appointed 1929), following his collaboration with Nazi Germany in the occupation of Norway.
1967: Thomas Chambers Windsor Roe (appointed 1953), following his conviction in Switzerland for fraud
1975: John Alan Maudsley (appointed 1970), following his conviction for bribery
1977: George Wilfred Newman (appointed 1966), following his conviction for corruption
1990: Edmund Rouse (appointed 1987), following his conviction for bribery.
2000: John Kevin Ashcroft (appointed 1989) following his conviction for breach of fiduciary duties.
2001: Freddie Emery-Wallis (appointed 1999), following his conviction for sexual abuse.
2005: Jim Speechley (appointed 1992) following his conviction for misconduct in a public office.
2012: Edward John Roberts (appointed 1993) following his conviction for sexual abuse.
2013: Chief Fire Officer Francis John Sheehan (appointed 2008) after being cautioned for making indecent images of children.
2015: Rolf Harris (appointed 2006) following his 2014 conviction for twelve indecent assaults on four girls aged from seven or eight to 19 between 1968 and 1986.
2015: Joanne Shuter (appointed 2010) following her conviction for expenses fraud.
2017: Paula Vasco-Knight (appointed 2014) following her conviction for fraud.
2020: Harvey Weinstein (appointed 2004), following his conviction for sexual abuse.

OBE

1921: Lieutenant-Colonel Cecil Malone MP (appointed 1919), following his conviction under the Defence of the Realm (Acquisition of Land) Act 1920
1922: Captain Reginald Stuart Lindsell (appointed 1919) "in consequence of his having been dismissed from His Majesty's Service by sentence of a General Court Martial" following his dismissal from the Army by a General Court-martial.
1922: Captain Arthur Henry Jolliffe (appointed 1919) "in consequence of his having been cashiered and sentenced to imprisonment by sentence of a General Court-martial" having been cashiered and sentenced to imprisonment by a General Court-martial.
1922: Captain John Stuart Broadbent (appointed 1919) "in consequence of his having been convicted by the Civil Power."
1924: Major Hugh Lidwell Flack (appointed 1919) following a civil conviction.
1924: Major Charles James Napier (appointed 1919) following a civil conviction
1924: Frank Carlyle Kieller Mitchell (appointed 1918) following a conviction and 21-month sentence for "fraudulently converting to his own use three-cheques of the value of £5,787, the property of his employers"
1925: Ernest Brooks (appointed 1920) also stripped of his British Empire Medal
1926: Lieutenant-Colonel James Christie (appointed 1919) 
1943: Colonel (Sir) Edgar Henry Newton (appointed 1937)
1947: Lieutenant-Colonel Philip Henry Tedman (appointed 1945) following his dismissal from service following a Field General Court-Martial.
1947: Lieutenant-Colonel William Stewart (appointed 1945) 
1949: Squadron Leader Hugh Murray (appointed 1944) 
1949: Man Wai Wong (appointed 1947), following his conviction for outlawry in Malaya.
1950: Colonel Louis Pedretti (appointed 1944) having been cashiered and sentenced to three-years in prison for corruption by a general court-martial, he received bribes totalling £8,500 from Egyptian contractors.
1950: Wing Commander Alan Lennox Thomson Naish (appointed 1946), following bankruptcy.
1961: Stephen Mackenzie (appointed 1949) following his court-martial and discharge.
1965: Kim Philby (appointed 1946), following his exposure as a double agent.
1966: William Gordon Tong (appointed 1960), following conviction and being sentenced to two-years in prison for obtaining money by false pretences and obtaining credit by fraud.
1979: David Tempest (appointed 1969)
1979: Colonel Frank Percival Nurdin (appointed 1969), following a conviction for corruption related to the sale of radio equipment for Chieftain tanks for Iran.
1988: Lester Piggott (appointed 1975), following his conviction for tax fraud.
1993: George Walter Hodgson (appointed 1983)
1994: James Taylor (appointed 1982)
1995: Commander Anthony Leslie Horton (appointed 1989)
1997: Richard Stuart Lines (appointed 1990) following his conviction for fraud.
2001: Philippe Le Roux (appointed 1990), following his conviction under the Financial Services Act 1986.
2000: Morgan Fahey, former Deputy Mayor of Christchurch, New Zealand, (appointed 1977) following his conviction for sexual abuse.
2001: Robin David Peverett (appointed 1995) following his conviction for child abuse.
2001: Dr John Roylance (appointed 1994), following his conviction by the General Medical Council for serious professional misconduct.
2005: Edward "Eddie" Aldridge (appointed 1996) following his conviction for fraud.
2006: Dennis Edward Grant (appointed 1984), following his conviction for sexual abuse.
2007: Bishop of Grafton Donald Shearman (appointed 1978) following being defrocked for sexual assault
2012: East Lothian Council Chief Executive John Lindsay (appointed 2005) following being fired for failing the council.
2013: Leslie Smith (appointed 1994), following his conviction for indecent assault
2013: Peter Nicholson (appointed 2005), following his conviction for fraud
2013: Michael C. Brewer (appointed 1995), following his conviction for five counts of indecent assault.
2013: Stuart Hall (appointed 2012), following his conviction for 14 sexual assaults.
2017: Philip Anthony Knight (appointed 2001)
2017: Patrick Rock (appointed 1992) after he was found guilty of making indecent images of children the previous year.
2017: Paul Symonds (appointed 2007) following allegations of child sex abuse.
2017: Anne Ganley (appointed 2013) following her conviction for perverting the course of justice.

MBE

1921: Lieutenant Ernest Middleton (appointed 1919) in "consequence of his having been cashiered by sentence of a General Court-Martial"
1921: Harry William John Wilkinson (appointed 1919) "in consequence of his having been convicted by the Civil Power"
1921: Shakar Khan (appointed 1919)
1922: Lieutenant James George Annand Forbes (appointed 1919) "in consequence of his having been convicted by the Civil Power"
1922: Captain John Stuart Broadbent (appointed 1919)
1922: Captain Ernest Robert Powell (appointed 1918)
1923: Major Edward Seymour Odell (appointed 1919)
1923: Major Ernest Frederick Strachan (appointed 1919)
1923: Lieutenant John Morgan Knight (appointed 1919)
1924: Captain Douglas McLaren (appointed 1918)
1925: Leicester Philip Sydney (appointed 1920)
1925: Captain Arthur Nowell Broad (appointed 1919)
1925: James Alexander Webster (appointed 1920)
1926: Captain Michael John Hanney (appointed 1919)
1929: Edward Albert Rix (appointed 1926)
1929: Lee Peck Hock (appointed 1923)
1930: Francis George Clarkson (appointed 1918)
1934: Deputy Chief Constable William Jones (appointed 1920)
1936: Frank Jago Munford (appointed 1918) 
1937: Deputy Chief Constable of Lincolnshire Police William Ewart Gladstone Trigg (appointed 1918), also stripped of his King's Police Medal
1944: Robert Hutchison (appointed 1940) in "consequence of his having been dismissed from His Majesty's Service by sentence of a General Court-Martial"
1944: Captain Edwin Illirgworth (appointed 1943) in "consequence of his having been dismissed from His Majesty's Service by sentence of a General Court-Martial"
1949: Major Frank Reuben Williams (appointed 1944)
1949: Warrant Officer James Walter McDowell Day (appointed 1944)
1949: Thomas Steele Dolan (appointed 1945) for "having been convicted by the Civil Power"
1949: Fredreick Donald Reiffer (appointed 1945)   for "having been convicted by the Civil Power"
1950: Captain Francis Joseph Fone (appointed 1949) 
1950: Major William Jardine Barnish (appointed 1945) was also stripped of his Territorial Efficiency Medal with two clasps.
1950: Captain Robert Charles Deboice Douglas (appointed 1947)
1950: Flight sergeant George Lofthouse (appointed 1945) was also stripped of two Mentioned in Despatches
1951: Flight Lieutenant John Edward Parr (appointed 1949)
1951: Major Emanuel Saphir (appointed 1945)
1951: Captain Frank Peter Edwards (appointed 1944)
1952: Major Frederick George Percy Hicks (appointed 1943)
1952: Major Kenneth Frank Morrill (appointed 1945)
1952: Captain Otto Nyquist (appointed 1946)
1952: Captain John Musgrave King (appointed 1946)
1955: Major Russell William Hatch (appointed 1945)
1956: Harry Holliday (appointed 1954)
1956: Captain Arthur James Britnell (appointed 1950)
1956: Major Frank William White (appointed 1944)
1958: Warrant Officer Class 1 Lionel Henry Bryson (appointed 1950)
1962: Hugh Hickman (appointed 1949)
1963: Lieutenant-Colonel John Sydney Noel Pounds (appointed 1949) as "consequence of him having been convicted by Court-Martial Service and dismissed from Her Majesty's War Office"
1965: Captain William Henry Eardley (appointed 1954)
1966: William Alexander McConnach (appointed 1952)
1967: Captain Leslie Gordon Creighton (appointed 1951)
1968: Lieutenant-Colonel Jack Constable Price Rowe (appointed 1943)
1969: Wing Commander Henry Lyons Webb (appointed 1959) 
1969: Oliver Alfred Sidney Cutts (appointed 1963)
1973: Lieutenant Commander Leslie Albert Shipp (appointed 1972)
1975: William Spens, 2nd Baron Spens (appointed 1954), following his conviction for theft.
1980: Graham Griffiths (appointed 1970)
1986: Margaret Crowfoot (appointed 1977)
1986: Arthur Gerald Lee (appointed 1983).
1987: Major Peter John Darrington (appointed 1984), following his sentencing by Court-Martial.
1989: Edward Rutledge  (appointed 1987)
1994: John Hanna Napier (appointed 1991)
1996: William John Johnston (appointed 1991)
1996: David Hardman (appointed 1994)
1996: Frederick Alwyn Oliver Jones (appointed 1994)
1997: Stanley Lewis Brown (appointed 1982), following his conviction for sexual abuse.
2000: Squadron Leader Brian Trood (appointed 1991), following his conviction for sexual assault.
2001: Cyril Albert Broom (appointed 1996)
2002: Phil Taylor (appointed 2000), following his conviction for sexual assault.
2004: Cyril Littlewood (appointed 1971), following his conviction for sexual abuse (MVO also revoked).
2006: Trevor Richardson (appointed 1998), following his conviction for child abuse
2006: Gordon Crearer Fulton Scott (appointed 1998), following his conviction for possession of child pornography.
2006: Jamnadas Virji Sudra (appointed 1996), following his conviction for sexual assault.
2006: Flight Lieutenant Michael Eke (appointed 2003), following his conviction for theft and deception.
2006: Naseem Hamed (appointed 1999), following his conviction for dangerous driving.
2008: Warrant Officer Class 2 Nicholas Charles McKeown (appointed 1997), following his conviction for possession of child pornography.
2009: Hooman Ghalamkari (appointed 11 June 2005), following conviction on charges of false accounting and theft of prescriptions relating to the pharmacy he ran.
2009: Peter Thomas Cornwell (appointed 2003).
2011: Junaid Quershi (appointed 1999) following his conviction for sex offences
2011: Henry Charles Day (appointed 2003) following his conviction for child sex offences.
2012: Dr Roselle Antoine (appointed 2005) following her conviction for conning foreign students into handing over thousands of pounds for bogus qualifications.
2012: Professor Charles Powys Butler (appointed 2005) following his conviction for fraudulently claiming almost £150,000 in expenses from the NHS.
2012: Ian John McClure (appointed 2000) following his conviction for child molestation.
2013: David Bradley (appointed 2007) after was found guilty of unacceptable professional conduct.
2013: David Russon (appointed 2001) after being found guilty of inappropriate behaviour in schools
2016: Jawaid Mohammed Ishaq (appointed 2000) following his conviction for fraud.
2017: Lee Anthony Bushill (appointed 2004)
2017: Robert Neville James Constable (appointed 1975) following his conviction for child sex offences.
2017: Adrian Lee Stone (appointed 2012) following his conviction for child sex offences.
2017 Robert Stanley Poots (appointed 2010) following his conviction for fraud, forgery and false accounting.
2017: Craig Martin Burrows (appointed 2004) following his conviction for child sex offences.
2017: Robert Lovegrove (appointed 1998)
2017: Philippa Ann Rodale (appointed 2007) following her conviction for animal welfare offences.
2017: David Kemp (appointed 2013) following conviction for child pornography.
2017: Scott Trevor Francis (appointed 2012) following conviction for child abuse.
2017: Derek Eaglestone (appointed 1994) following conviction for sex crimes.

Distinguished Service Order

1911: Major William Edward O'Brien (appointed 1901)
1918: Major Sydney Herbert Chapin (appointed 1900)
1919: Lieutenant-Colonel Ludger Jules Oliver Daly-Gingras (appointed 1917)
1920: Lieutenant-Colonel Sydney Douglas Rumbold (appointed 1917)
1920: Major John Andrew Baillie (appointed 1902) (name restored 1931)
1921: Major Ewen Cameron Bruce (appointed 1920) 
1922: Lieutenant-Colonel Herbert Allcard (appointed 1901)
1936: Lieutenant-Colonel Denis Daly (appointed 1919)

Queen's Police Medal

1975: Chief Superintendent of Royal Hong Kong Police Force Peter Godber (conferred 1972) - Colonial Police Medal also revoked.
2017: Chief Constable of Avon and Somerset Constabulary Nick Gargan (conferred 2012) following convictions for misconduct.

British Empire Medal

1951: Leonard Albert Smith (awarded 1947)
1957: Henry Alexander Tavendale (awarded 1949) following his conviction by Court-Martial and discharge from Her Majesty's Forces
1966: Norman Frederick Hemmings (awarded 1960)
1980: Frederick Thomas Jolley (awarded 1974)
1996: Sidney Charles Williamson Longstaffe (awarded 1989)
2000: Ernest Robert Donald (awarded 1985), following his conviction for sexual abuse.
2001: Jim Rendall (awarded 1990) following his conviction for fraud.

Imperial Service Medal

2014: William Brefni Moore following his conviction for possessing indecent images of children.

Volunteer Officers' Decoration

1896: Frederick Walter Roberts 
1898: Captain and Honorary Major Alexander Hay, following his conviction for embezzlement.
1899: Lieutenant-Colonel and Honorary Colonel George Raymond Birt, following his conviction for fraud.
1902: Captain and Honorary Major Richard Lewis, following his conviction for embezzlement.

Order of St John

Member

2014: David John Cooper (appointed 2011)
2017: Peter Grant Rodda (appointed 1984)

References

Revocations